Northern Corridor is a busy and an important transport route to the East and Central Africa countries of Burundi, Eastern DR Congo, Kenya, Rwanda, South Sudan and Uganda.

The main Northern Corridor transport network is connected to the Port of Mombasa and includes a road network; railways belonging to Kenya Railways Corporation and Uganda Railways Corporation; rail-lake transport; inland water routes; container terminals commonly regarded locally as ICDs (Inland Container Depots); Tororo Inland Port - whose contract was awarded to Great Lakes Ports Limited of Kenya amid opposition from clearing firms and truck transporters; plus an oil pipeline.

The alternative transport network serving the landlocked Great Lakes Region is through Tanzania, called the Central Corridor linked to Dar es Salaam. This uses Tanzania's Central Line.

Sources

Transport in Burundi
Transport in Rwanda
Transport in the Democratic Republic of the Congo
Transport in Uganda
Transport infrastructure in Kenya